Artemisia longifolia  is North American species in the daisy family, known by the common name long-leaved sage or longleaf wormwood. It is native to western Canada (Manitoba, Saskatchewan, Alberta, British Columbia) and the north-central United States (Montana, the Dakotas, Minnesota, Wyoming, and Colorado with a few isolated populations in Oklahoma).
 
Artemisia longifolia is a perennial up to 80 cm (32 inches) tall, usually not forming clumps. Leaves are longer and narrower than for most related species, up to 12 cm (5 inches) long. The species grows in barren areas, in grasslands, and in alkaline flats in the high plains.

References

longifolia
Plants described in 1818
Flora of North America